Wladimir Petrovich Köppen (25 September 1846 – 22 June 1940) was a Russian-German geographer, meteorologist, climatologist and botanist. After studies in St. Petersburg, he spent the bulk of his life and professional career in Germany and Austria.  His most notable contribution to science was the development of the Köppen climate classification system, which, with some modifications, is still commonly used.  Köppen made significant contributions to several branches of science, and coined the name aerology for the science of measuring the upper air/atmosphere.

Background and education 

Wladimir Köppen was born in St. Petersburg, Russia. He lived there until he was 20 years old. He died in Graz, Austria. Köppen's grandfather was one of several German doctors invited to Russia by Empress Catherine II to improve sanitation and was later personal physician to the tsar. His son, Wladimir's father, Peter von Köppen (1793–1864), was a noted geographer, historian and ethnographer of ancient Russian cultures and an important contributor to intellectual exchanges between western European slavists and Russian scientists. He attended secondary school in Simferopol, Crimea, and began his studies of botany in 1864 at the University of St. Petersburg.

He frequently traveled to his family's estate on the Crimean coast from St. Petersburg and to and from Simferopol, in the interior of the peninsula. The floral and geographical diversity of the Crimean peninsula, as well as the starker geographical transitions between the capital and his home, did much to awaken an interest in the relationship between climate and the natural world. In 1867, he transferred to the University of Heidelberg and in 1870 he defended his doctorate dissertation on the effects of temperature on plant growth at the University of Leipzig. He served in the Prussian ambulance corps in the Franco-Prussian War and later worked at the Central Physical Observatory in St. Petersburg.

He identified five major climatic groups, which correspond with the five main vegetation groups:
 Tropical rainy climate
 Dry climate
 Warm temperature rainy climate
 Snowy and cold climate
 Polar climate

Career and contributions 
Köppen was a principal founder of modern climatology and meteorology. Between 1850 and 1860, Köppen contributed to Seewart's sailing handbooks for the Atlantic, Pacific and Indian Oceans by studying ship reports over the winds of different oceans. Between 1872 and 1873 Köppen was employed in the Russian meteorological service as an assistant where he helped prepare the daily synoptic weather map. In 1875, he moved back to Germany and became the chief of the new Division of Marine Meteorology at the German naval observatory (Deutsche Seewarte) based in Hamburg. There, he was responsible for establishing a weather forecasting service for the northwestern part of Germany and the adjacent sea areas. After four years of service, he was able to move on to his primary interest of fundamental research, and left the meteorological office.

Köppen began a systematic study of the climate and also experimented with balloons to obtain data from upper layers of the atmosphere. In 1884, he published the first version of his map of climatic zones in which the seasonal temperature ranges were plotted. It led to the development of the Köppen climate classification system around 1900, which he kept improving for the rest of his life. The full version of his system appeared first in 1918; after several modifications, the final version was published in 1936.

Apart from the description of various climate types, he was acquainted with paleoclimatology as well. In 1924, he and his son-in-law Alfred Wegener published a paper called Die  Klimate der Geologischen Vorzeit (The climates of the geological past) providing crucial support to the Milanković theory on ice ages. Also, in 1911 he co-wrote The Thermodynamics of the Atmosphere, a textbook that became very popular.

Towards the end of his life, Köppen cooperated with the German climatologist Rudolf Geiger to produce a five-volume work, Handbuch der Klimatologie (Handbook of Climatology). It was never completed, but several parts, three of them by Köppen, were published. After Köppen's death in 1940, Geiger continued to work on modifications to the climate classification system.

Köppen was a prolific scientist, producing more than 500 papers, and he retained his intellectual curiosity and wide range of interests throughout his life. In 1890, he co-authored the first cloud atlas. Alongside scientific pursuits, he was actively involved in social questions, devoting much time and energy to such problems of land-use and school reform and nutrition for the underprivileged. He was a strong advocate for the use of Esperanto in the cause of world peace, translating several of his publications into Esperanto.

He had a wife, Marie, and five children including daughter Else. Marie's sister Sophie and her children moved in with the Köppens in 1888.

Bibliography
 Köppen, Wladimir and Wegener, Alfred (1924): The Climates of the Geological Past ' Facsimile of the German original and English translation of 'Die Klimate der Geologischen Vorzeit' Berlin, Stuttgart: Gebr. Borntraeger 
 Else Wegener-Köppen, Jörn Thiede (2018): Wladimir Köppen: Scholar for Life (Ein Gelehrtenleben für die Meteorologie), Borntraeger Science Publishers , 316p. (English and German language biography of Wladimir Köppen, highlighting his research with an updated bibliography.)

See also
List of Russian meteorologists

References

Sources
 Allaby, Michael (2000). Encyclopedia of Weather and Climate. New York: Facts On File, Inc. .
 Wille, Robert-Jan Wille (2017): Colonizing the Free Atmosphere:  Wladimir Köppen’s ‘Aerology’, the German Maritime Observatory, and the Emergence of a Trans-Imperial Network of Weather Balloons and Kites, 1873-1906, History of Meteorology 8 (2017).

External links
 

German climatologists
German meteorologists
German phytogeographers
Scientists from the Russian Empire
1846 births
1940 deaths
.Wladimir
Russian phytogeographers
Russian meteorologists
Russian Esperantists
Scientists from Saint Petersburg
19th-century German geologists
20th-century German geologists
19th-century German botanists
20th-century German botanists